Frankie H Nicklin (born 20 January 2005) is an Australian cricketer who currently plays for New South Wales in the Women's National Cricket League (WNCL). She plays as a right-arm leg break bowler.

Domestic career
In the summer of 2022, Nicklin played club cricket in Berkshire in England, as well as appearing in friendlies for the Berkshire Women cricket team.

In January 2023, Nicklin made her debut for New South Wales, against South Australia in the Women's National Cricket League.

References

External links

2005 births
Living people
Place of birth missing (living people)
Australian women cricketers
New South Wales Breakers cricketers